Deep Rooted Tree is a 2011 South Korean television series starring Han Suk-kyu, Jang Hyuk and Shin Se-kyung. Based on the novel of the same name by Lee Jung-myung, it aired on SBS from 5 October to 22 December 2011 on Wednesdays and Thursdays at 21:55 for 24 episodes.

Taking its name from the poem Yongbieocheonga that says that trees with deep roots do not sway, the series tells the story of a royal guard (played by Jang Hyuk) investigating a case involving the serial murders of Jiphyeonjeon scholars in Gyeongbok Palace while King Sejong (played by Han Suk-kyu, in his TV comeback after 16 years of solely film work) comes to create the Korean alphabet.

Synopsis
Early in his reign, King Sejong inevitably causes the death of his in-laws and their slaves in an attempt to save them from his brutal father, King Taejong, mainly due to his lack of authority and power. Two young slaves, Ddol-bok and his friend Dam, survive but neither knows if the other has.  Ddol-bok blames the king and vows to kill him to avenge the deaths of everyone he loved and spends years becoming a great warrior.  Dam, who has a photographic memory, becomes a court lady called So-yi (Shin Se-kyung), but she feels so guilty about her role in the other slaves' deaths that she becomes mute.

Ddol-bok returns to the palace under the name of Kang Chae-yoon (Jang Hyuk) to kill the king.  However, during his time there, he becomes embroiled in the mystery surrounding the deaths of several Hall of Worthies scholars.  The deaths were caused by a secret society called "Hidden Root," which was created long ago by followers of Jeong Do-jeon, with the goal of giving more power to ministers and less to the king.  King Taejong killed Jeong Do-jeon and all of his family except his nephew, Jeong Gi-joon, who is now the leader of Hidden Root and lives in disguise not far from King Sejong.

It soon becomes known that the king, with the help of So-yi and the Hall of Worthies scholars, has been working for years on a secret project, which turns out to be the creation of the Korean alphabet.  While tracking Hidden Root, Kang Chae-yoon and So-yi each realizes who the other really is - Ddol-bok and Dam. Realizing that each other are the ones who they were dying to find, So-yi begins to speak. So-yi shows Chae-yoon the alphabet and describes how it will give more power to commoners. Chae-yoon is amazed with the simplicity of the alphabet and is convinced to work with the king instead of killing him.

However, Jeong Gi-joon believes that the new alphabet is a threat to Confucian order, and decides to stop it at all costs.  He murders the king's son, but this only makes Sejong more determined.  Jeong is able to stop the king's dissemination efforts, and on the day the alphabet is to be publicly announced, both So-yi and Chae-yoon are fatally wounded by Hidden Root members.  However, through their sacrifices, the event is successful, and commoners begin to use Hangul.

Cast

Main
Han Suk-kyu as King Sejong
Song Joong-ki as teen Yi Do
Kang San  as child Yi Do 
The creator of Hangul. During his early years as king, Yi Do had a strained relationship with his father and harbored guilt for seeing people's suffering and death (including his wife's family) under his father's tyrannical rule. After the death of his father and his wife Soheon, Yi Do (now called King Sejong) employs Kang Chae-yoon as an investigator (unaware he is the same boy whom he spared years before) and is helped by So-yi in the creation of Hangul. He later finds out that Chae-yoon is the same boy who tried to kill him.

Jang Hyuk as Kang Chae-yoon/Ddol-bok 
Yeo Jin-goo as teen Ddol-bok
Chae Sang-woo as child Ddol-bok 
A former slave who has become royal guard and detective of King Sejong. As a child, Ddol-bok  protected his intellectually disabled father from the teasing of other servants of the Queen's family. Later, Ddol-bok 's father was arrested and beaten, finally dying in front of him and his childhood friend So-yi. Though he was actually saved by King Sejong, he doesn't know it, and because he blames Sejong for his father's death, has sworn to avenge him by killing the king.  He becomes a soldier under a changed name, and also trains under a martial arts master named Lee Bang-Ji, who showed him the way of the leaping martial arts that shows incredible speed, agility, power and stamina. Chae-yoon later becomes a low-level guard along with his friends, because he wants to keep a low profile from the king. He doesn't know that So-yi is Dam, believing that she is dead.

Shin Se-kyung as So-yi/Dam
Kim Hyun-soo as young Dam
Chae-yoon's friend who was saved as a child by Sejong's wife and became a court lady. During her early years as court lady, Yi Do apologized to her for his role in her family's death.  She feels so guilty about her role in her fellow slaves' deaths that she cannot speak, but she is useful in the creation of Hangul because of her photographic memory.

Supporting
Jeon No-min as Jeong Do-kwang
"Sambong" Jeong Do-jeon's brother
Yoon Je-moon as Jeong Gi-joon/Ga Ri-on
Choi Woo-shik as young Jeong Gi-joon/Ga Ri-on
Ahn Suk-hwan as Lee Shin-juk 
Lee Jae-yong as Jo Mal-saeng 
Kwon Tae-won as Choe Manri
Jeon Seung-hwan as Hwang Hui
Cho Jin-woong as Moo-hyul 
Sejong's bodyguard and friend who would sacrifice himself to protect his friend. 
Park Hyuk-kwon as Jeong In-ji 
Jang Ji-eun as Queen Soheon
Kim Ki-bang as Cho-tak 
Shin Seung-hwan as Park Po 
Song Ok-sook as Do Dam-daek
Han Sang-jin as Shim Jong-soo
Seo Jun-young as Prince Gwangpyeong 
Lee Soo-hyuk as Yoon Pyeong
Baek Su-ho as young Pyeong
An assassin who was smitten by So-yi when he took her hostage.
Kim Ki-bum as Pak Paengnyeon 
Hyun Woo as Seong Sam-mun 
Jo Hee-bong as Han Myung-hoi/Han Ga-nom 
Jung Da-bin as Yeon-doo
Jeon Young-bin as Mak-soo 
Woo Hyun as Lee Bang-ji
Yoo Hyun-soo as Lee Soon-ji 
Shin So-yul as Mok-ya
Shim So-heon as Deok-geum 
Baek Yoon-sik as King Taejong/Yi Bangwon (cameo)
Han In-soo as Sim On (cameo)
Choi Il-hwa as Kim Jongseo
Heo Joon-seok as Kkeut-soo 
Ryu Seung-soo as Jang Sung-soo 
Baek Seo-bin as Jang Eun-sung 	
Min Ji-young as Yeon-doo's mother 
Lee Se-na as Geun-ji
Choi Jung-woo as Park Eun
Jung Yoo-chan as Heo Dam
Jung Joon-won as child with bone cancer
Kim Sung-hyun as Kareupeyi Temukan (Alias: Gae Pa-yi)
Though his origins are vague, the drama refers him to be from the Yuan Dynasty (Modern China, Russia and Mongolia). He is a master assassin who belonged to the mercenary group called the Gokturks. It is said no one can fight him and win that's why he is also called the invincible man. His skills exceed those of Kang Chae-yoon, Moo-hyul and Yoon Pyeong. The only one that is equally matched to him is Lee Bang-ji, whom he kills.

Ratings

Source: AGB Nielsen Korea

Awards and nominations

International broadcast
It aired in Japan on KNTV from 24 July to 17 September 2012, which was followed by reruns on terrestrial network TV Tokyo.

It aired in Thailand on Channel 7 every Monday to Thursday at 2.10 a.m. starting  14 January 2016.

References

External links
Deep Rooted Tree official SBS website 

2011 South Korean television series debuts
2011 South Korean television series endings
Seoul Broadcasting System television dramas
Sejong the Great
Television series set in the Joseon dynasty
Korean-language television shows
South Korean historical television series
Television shows based on South Korean novels
Television series by IHQ (company)
Television shows written by Kim Young-hyun